William Henry Furness Jr. (1827 – 1867) was an American portrait painter.  He was born in Philadelphia to Annis P. Jenks and William Henry Furness.  He began his career as a portrait painter in Philadelphia but soon moved to Boston, where he found greater success. Among others, he painted portraits of Lucretia Mott and Senator Charles Sumner.  He studied art in Europe for several years.
His father was the minister of the First Unitarian Church of Philadelphia and an ardent abolitionist.  His brother Frank Furness was one of Philadelphia's most prominent architects.

References

External links
  A collection of paintings by William Henry Furness, Jr. at American Gallery.

1827 births
1867 deaths
American portrait painters
Artists from Philadelphia
Furness family